Golden Bough is a Celtic-music band formed in 1980 and based in California. The band performs at music festivals and has toured Europe several times. They are known for their acoustic musical performances of folk music and Celtic music and for their 22 albums. They are also known for their association with Lief Sørbye (a founding member) and with the band Tempest.

Current members of the band include Margie Butler (lyric soprano) on vocals, Celtic harp, penny whistle, recorder, bodhran and guitar; Paul Espinoza (folk tenor) on vocals, guitar, accordion and octave-mandolin; Kathy Sierra (folk soprano) on vocals, violin and viola.

Band origins
The band came about after some friends attended a series of concerts at the Cannery at Fisherman's Wharf in San Francisco. The founders were Margie Butler, Margot Duxler, Lief Sørbye, and Paul Espinoza. Simon Spaulding also performed with them in the first lineup. Other artists who have been members include Florie Brown (violinist), Richard Ferry (flutist), Alison Bailey (fiddler), and Sue Draheim (violinist).

Music
The band describes their music as "rooted in" the traditional music of Ireland, Scotland, Wales, Cornwall, The Isle of Man, French Brittany and Spanish Galicia. The group creates its own arrangements of the songs, giving them "a sound unique unto themselves." Along with traditional works they have mined such singers as Eric Bogle (Green Fields of France), Archie Fisher (Witch of the Westmorelands) and Jamie McMenemy's setting of The Blind Harper of Lochmaben. They also perform their own original compositions.

Some examples of songs they sing include: Red is the Rose, The Sea Queen of Connemara, The Wizard, Shifty Morgan, The Tailor and the Mouse, Black is the Color of My True Love's Hair, The Rattlin' Bog, Green Grow the Rashes-O, Charlie is my Darling, My Little Boat, Black Jack Davy, The Song of the Swan Maiden, Muirsheen Durkin, Isle of Hope, Isle of Tears by Brendan Graham, and perhaps even the Turlough O'Carolan tune, Carolan's Draught.

Song details
 Black Jack Davy is a takeoff of the traditional song Black Jack Davy. It was written by Paul Espinoza and released on the Golden Bough album, The Boatman's Daughter in 1983. In the traditional song, a man pursues his wife or lover, who has run off with the Gypsy man, Black Jack Davy. In Espinoza's version, Black Jack Davy is the pursuing lover, still looking for his lady after three years. He is presented as a ghost who cannot give up his search.

Discography
 1981 	Golden Bough
 1984 Flight of Fantasy
 1988 	Far from Home
 1992 	The Boatman's Daughter
 1993 	Kids at Heart: Celtic Songs for Children
 1994 	Winding Road
 1994 	Beyond the Shadows
 1995 	Festival of Irish Music
 1996 	Christmas in a Celtic Land
 1998 	Celtic Music from Ireland, Scotland & Brittany
 1999 	Song of the Celts
 2001 	Contemporary Songs: The Night Wind
 2002 	Songs of Scotland
 2004 	Songs of the Irish Immigrants
 2006 	Golden Bough Live
 2007 	Celtic Folk Songs
 2008 	Pirate Gold
 2008 	Jug of Punch: Popular Irish Pub Songs
 2009 	Celtic Love Songs
 2010 	Celtic Christmas Songs
 Songs From Scotland
 Winter's Dance

References

External links
 Golden Bough's web site.
 Bio of Golden Bough
 Lyrics to The Blind Harper of Lochmaben as sung by Golden Bough.
 Songs by Paul Espinoza of Golden Bough

American folk musicians
Songwriters from California
Celtic music groups
Irish music arrangers
Musical groups from San Francisco